Nicolae Crețulescu (surname also spelled Kretzulescu; 1 March 1812 – 26 June 1900) was a Wallachian, later Romanian politician and physician. He served two terms as Prime Minister of Romania: from 1862 to 1863, and from 1865 to 1866. He was elected to the Romanian Academy. He was the 3rd president of the Romanian Academy from 1872 to 1873.

Born in Bucharest, he studied medicine in Paris, having Gustave Flaubert as a colleague. As a physician, his notable work was the translation of Jean Cruveilhier's manual of anatomy.

A member of the Liberal faction, Crețulescu first became prime minister after the assassination of Barbu Catargiu, under ruler Alexandru Ioan Cuza. He avoided debating the issue of land reform, at that time the most contentious subject in Romanian politics; instead, Crețulescu focused on unifying the public health system, creating the Directorate General of the Public Archive, and establishing a Council for Public Instruction. Additionally, he laid the groundwork for further laws secularizing the property of monasteries.

References 

1812 births
1900 deaths
Politicians from Bucharest
Physicians from Bucharest
National Liberal Party (Romania) politicians
Prime Ministers of the Principality of Wallachia
Prime Ministers of Romania
Romanian Ministers of Agriculture
Romanian Ministers of Culture
Romanian Ministers of Education
Romanian Ministers of Finance
Romanian Ministers of Interior
Romanian Ministers of Justice
Romanian Ministers of Public Works
Members of the Chamber of Deputies (Romania)
Presidents of the Senate of Romania
Members of the Senate of Romania
Presidents of the Romanian Academy
19th-century Romanian physicians
Romanian translators
19th-century translators
Burials at Bellu Cemetery